Luca Allan Petrasso (born June 16, 2000) is a Canadian soccer player who plays as a left-back for Major League Soccer club Orlando City SC.

Career

Early career 
Petrasso joined the Toronto FC Academy in 2013, when he was 12. Petrasso joined the Senior Academy team in League1 Ontario in 2016, making his debut on June 4 against ProStars FC, where he scored an 86th minute game winning goal to win the match 3-2. On September 23, 2017, he scored four goals in a 5-1 victory over North Mississauga SC.

On March 15, 2018, he signed his first professional contract with Toronto FC II in the second-tier USL. He made his professional debut on April 26 against the Richmond Kickers. He scored his first professional goal on April 6, 2019 against Orlando City B, which was the club's first goal in USL League One after the club dropped down to the third tier in 2019. He re-signed with the team for the 2021 season.

Toronto FC
On January 11, 2022, Toronto FC announced they had signed Petrasso to the senior side as a Homegrown Player through 2023. He made his MLS debut on March 5, starting against the New York Red Bulls, recording his first assist on a Jesús Jiménez goal in a 4-1 loss.

Orlando City
On November 9, 2022, Petrasso was acquired in a trade by Orlando City in exchange for $300,000 in 2023 General Allocation Money, with the potential for an additional $50,000 in 2024 and $50,000 in 2025 should certain conditions be met.

International career
In 2017, Petrasso represented the Canada U17 team at the 2017 CONCACAF U-17 Championship.

Personal
He is the younger brother of York United FC player Michael Petrasso.

Career statistics

Club

Honours
Toronto FC
Canadian Championship: 2020

References

External links
 
 
 

2000 births
Living people
Canadian soccer players
Association football defenders
Soccer players from Toronto
Toronto FC players
Toronto FC II players
USL Championship players
USL League One players
Homegrown Players (MLS)
Major League Soccer players
Orlando City SC players